Marla J. Luckert (born July 20, 1955) is the chief justice of the Kansas Supreme Court appointed by Governor Bill Graves on November 20, 2002, and sworn on January 13, 2003.

Personal life
Marla J. Luckert was born in Goodland, Kansas. At Washburn University she earned a Bachelor of Arts in history in 1977 and a Juris Doctor from Washburn University School of Law in 1980.

Professional life
After law school, Luckert joined the firm of Goodell, Stratton, Edmonds and Palmer in Topeka, Kansas. She also served as an adjunct professor of law at Washburn. Luckert was appointed by Governor Joan Finney to the Third Judicial District Court in 1992. In 2000, she became chief justice of the Third Judicial Court. In 2003 she was appointed to the Kansas Supreme Court by Governor Bill Graves.

Luckert has served as president of the Kansas Bar Association, the Kansas District Judges Association, the Kansas Women Attorneys Association, the Topeka Bar Association, the Sam A. Crow Inn of Court, and the Women Attorneys Association of Topeka. Luckert is a Fellow of the American Bar Foundation and the Kansas Bar Foundation.

On December 17, 2019, Luckert became Chief Justice of the Kansas Supreme Court after the retirement of Lawton Nuss.

Awards
 YWCA Woman of Excellence Award (1996)
 Kansas Bar Association Outstanding Service Award (1990)
 Kansas Association of Defense Counsel's Distinguished Service Award (1990)

References

External links
Official Biography

|-

1955 births
21st-century American judges
Chief Justices of the Kansas Supreme Court
Kansas state court judges
Justices of the Kansas Supreme Court
Living people
People from Goodland, Kansas
People from Topeka, Kansas
Washburn University alumni
Women chief justices of state supreme courts in the United States
21st-century American women judges